The 1963 Colne Valley by-election was a parliamentary by-election for the British House of Commons constituency of Colne Valley on 21 March 1963.

Vacancy
The by-election was caused by the death of the sitting Labour MP, Glenvil Hall, on 13 October 1962. He had held the seat since a 1939 by-election.

Election history
Colne Valley had been won by Labour at every election since 1935, when they had gained the seat from the Liberals. The result at the previous general election was as follows;

Candidates
Labour selected 43-year-old Patrick Duffy. He had contested Tiverton in 1950, 1951 and 1955. Duffy was a lecturer at Leeds University from 1950 to 1963, who had been educated at the London School of Economics and Columbia University, New York City.

The Conservatives selected 28-year-old outsider, Andrew Alexander, a journalist and leader writer. Alexander was educated at Lancing College, and a former member of Dorchester Borough Council. He was a past chairman of North Kensington Young Conservatives and Dorchester Young Conservatives.

The Liberals re-selected 44-year-old Leeds man Richard Wainwright. He had contested Pudsey in 1950 and 1955 and Colne Valley in 1959. Wainwright was a chartered accountant, educated at Shrewsbury School and Clare College, Cambridge. He was a Member of the Liberal Party Committee and Council, and chairman of the Liberal Party Organization Department from 1955 to 1957.

An independent candidate, Arthur Fox, also stood. He was well-known as the owner of the "Revue Bar", a Manchester striptease club and an author on the subject.

174 people serving in the Armed Forces applied for nomination papers, as it was usual practice at the time that any serving personnel doing so would be given an honourable discharge.  However, unlike by-elections held late in the previous year, none of the candidates paid a deposit, and so they secured their release without appearing on the ballot paper.

Campaign
The election campaign was a long one, with polling day not taking place until five months after the death of the previous MP.

The main themes of Wainwright's Liberal campaign were State Pensions being tied to the cost of living index, creating a new Ministry of Employment, and no more nationalisation.

Result
The Labour vote share held up, while the Liberals gained support at the expense of the Conservatives. Significantly, Wainwright had managed to push the Conservative candidate into third place.

Aftermath
All three main party candidates did battle again at the following general election. Wainwright further closed the gap on the Labour Party. The result at the 1964 general election was;

Wainwright eventually defeated Duffy at the 1966 general election, and held the seat until his retirement in 1987. Duffy went on to become the MP for Sheffield Attercliffe, serving from 1970 to 1992.

References

Bibliography
 Who's Who: www.ukwhoswho.com
 By-Elections in British Politics by Cook and Ramsden
 Wainwright's election material: https://web.archive.org/web/20120507020835/http://www.by-elections.co.uk/colne63/Liberal.html

See also
 List of United Kingdom by-elections
 United Kingdom by-election records
 

1963 in England
Elections in Kirklees
1963 elections in the United Kingdom
By-elections to the Parliament of the United Kingdom in West Yorkshire constituencies
1960s in Yorkshire